Ashishim is a red lentil pancake dish of Ancient Israelite origin. According to the Talmud, it was a common dish eaten by Jews in antiquity.

History
Ashishim are pancakes or fritters made with crushed red lentils, eggs, flour and sesame seeds, which are mixed together to create a batter which is then deep fried and topped with a honey syrup, similar to the Sephardic Jewish sfinj.

Ashishim are mentioned numerous times in ancient Jewish texts, such as in the Torah, the Song of Songs, and in the Mishnah. A detailed recipe for making ashishim can be found in the Jerusalem Talmud.

See also
 Bimuelos- a similar Sephardic Jewish dish

References

Israelites
Israeli cuisine
Jewish cuisine
Pancakes

Lentil dishes